Wainscott may refer to:

Places
 Wainscott, Kent, England
 Wainscott, New York, US

People with the surname
 G. L. Wainscott, the creator of Ale-8-One
 Tina Wainscott, American author

See also
 Wainscot (disambiguation)